Tarell Basham (born March 18, 1994) is an American football outside linebacker for the Tennessee Titans of the National Football League (NFL). He played college football at Ohio from 2013 to 2016. He was drafted by the Indianapolis Colts in the third round of the 2017 NFL Draft.

Early years
Basham attended Franklin County High School in Rocky Mount, Virginia, where he had 82 tackles and 16 sacks in his career. Following high school, Basham attended military school for a year, before committing to Ohio University.

College career
Following high school, Basham spent one year at Hargrave Military Academy in Chatham, Virginia, a military post-graduate school, before enrolling in Ohio University, where he played for the Ohio Bobcats football team from 2013 to 2016. As a senior, he was awarded the Mid-American Conference Defensive Player of the Year and recorded a school record 11.5 sacks. During his career, Basham made 152 tackles and a school record 29.5 sacks.

Professional career

Indianapolis Colts
Basham was drafted by the Indianapolis Colts in the third round (80th overall) of the 2017 NFL Draft.

On October 4, 2018, Basham was waived by the Colts.

New York Jets

On October 5, 2018, Basham was claimed off waivers by the New York Jets.

In week 16 of the 2019 season against the Pittsburgh Steelers, Basham recorded an interception off a pass thrown by Devlin Hodges during the 16–10 win.  This was Basham's first career interception in the NFL.

Dallas Cowboys
On March 22, 2021, Basham signed a two-year contract with the Dallas Cowboys.

Basham was placed on injured reserve on September 17, 2022. He was activated on November 9. The Cowboys waived him on November 29.

Tennessee Titans
On December 5, 2022, Basham signed with the Tennessee Titans.

Personal life
Basham is the cousin of Buffalo Bills defensive end Carlos Basham Jr. He has three siblings; Thaddeus Basham, Kamiyah Ford and Tajia Dawson.

References

External links
Ohio Bobcats bio

1994 births
Living people
People from Rocky Mount, Virginia
Players of American football from Virginia
African-American players of American football
American football linebackers
American football defensive ends
Ohio Bobcats football players
Indianapolis Colts players
New York Jets players
Dallas Cowboys players
Hargrave Military Academy alumni
21st-century African-American sportspeople
Tennessee Titans players